Slievemargy is a barony in County Laois (formerly called Queen's County or County Leix), Ireland.

Etymology

The barony is named after the mountains.

It is also spelled Slieuemargue, Slewmergie, Slieuemargue, Slieuemargy.

Geography
Slievemargy is located in the western part of the River Barrow.

List of settlements

Below is a list of settlements in Slievemargy barony:
Arless
Ballickmoyler
Crettyard
Killeshin
Newtown
The Swan
Bilblá, County Carlow

References

Baronies of County Laois